December 2013

See also

References

 12
December 2013 events in the United States